The 1982 Fresno State Bulldogs football team represented California State University, Fresno as a member of the Pacific Coast Athletic Association (PCAA) during the 1982 NCAA Division I-A football season. Led by fifth-year head coach Jim Sweeney, Fresno State compiled an overall record of 11–1 with a mark of 6–0 in conference play, winning the PCAA title. The Bulldogs played their home games at Bulldog Stadium in Fresno, California.

Fresno State earned their first NCAA Division I-A postseason bowl game berth in 1982. They played Bowling Green in the second annual California Bowl at their own stadium on December 18, winning 29–28.

Schedule

Roster
WR Henry Ellard
WR Stephone Paige
RB Eric Redwood
QB Jeff Tedford
DB Tim Washington
RB Ken Williams

Team players in the NFL
The following were selected in the 1983 NFL Draft.

The following finished their college career in 1982, were not drafted, but played in the NFL.

References

Fresno State
Fresno State Bulldogs football seasons
Big West Conference football champion seasons
Fresno State Bulldogs football